Tianjin TEDA Co., Ltd. is a Chinese conglomerate based in Tianjin, China 

TEDA is the acronym of Tianjin Economic-Technological Development Area.

As at 8 November 2016, Tianjin TEDA is a consistent of SZSE Component Index but not in SZSE 300 Index, making the company was ranked between the 301st to 500th by free float adjusted market capitalization.

History
The predecessor of the company was founded on 20 July 1992 (as ). In 1996 the shares of the company was started to float on the Shenzhen Stock Exchange. In 1997 it was takeover by TEDA Group from Tianjin Textile Industry Corporation as a reverse IPO.

In the same year the company was renamed into Tianjin TEDA Co., Ltd..

References

External links
  

Companies established in 1992
Companies based in Tianjin
Companies owned by the provincial government of China
Conglomerate companies of China
Companies listed on the Shenzhen Stock Exchange